The dividing line between metals and nonmetals can be found, in varying configurations, on some representations of the periodic table of the elements (see mini-example, right). Elements to the lower left of the line generally display increasing metallic behaviour; elements to the upper right display increasing nonmetallic behaviour. When presented as a regular stair-step, elements with the highest critical temperature for their groups (Li, Be, Al, Ge, Sb, Po) lie just below the line.

Names
This line has been called the amphoteric line, the metal-nonmetal line, the metalloid line, the semimetal line, or the staircase. While it has also been called the Zintl border or the Zintl line these terms instead refer to a vertical line sometimes drawn between groups 13 and 14. This particular line was named by Laves in 1941. It differentiates group 13 elements from those in and to the right of group 14. The former generally combine with electropositive metals to make intermetallic compounds whereas the latter usually form salt-like compounds.

History
References to a dividing line between metals and nonmetals appear in the literature as far back as at least 1869. In 1891, Walker published a periodic 'tabulation' with a diagonal straight line drawn between the metals and the nonmetals. In 1906, Alexander Smith published a periodic table with a zigzag line separating the nonmetals from the rest of elements, in his highly influential textbook Introduction to General Inorganic Chemistry. In 1923, Horace G. Deming, an American chemist, published short (Mendeleev style) and medium (18-column) form periodic tables. Each one had a regular stepped line separating metals from nonmetals. Merck and Company prepared a handout form of Deming's 18-column table, in 1928, which was widely circulated in American schools. By the 1930s Deming's table was appearing in handbooks and encyclopaedias of chemistry. It was also distributed for many years by the Sargent-Welch Scientific Company.

Double line variant
A dividing line between metals and nonmetals is sometimes replaced by two dividing lines. One line separates metals and metalloids; the other metalloids and nonmetals.

Concerns
Mendeleev wrote that, 'It is ... impossible to draw a strict line of demarcation between metals and nonmetals, there being many intermediate substances'. Several other sources note confusion or ambiguity as to the location of the dividing line; suggest its apparent arbitrariness provides grounds for refuting its validity; and comment as to its misleading, contentious or approximate nature. Deming himself noted that the line could not be drawn very accurately.

Notes

Citations

References
Abraham M, Coshow, D & Fix, W 1994, Periodicity: A source book module, version 1.0. Chemsource, Inc., New York, viewed 26 Aug 11
Brown L & Holme T 2006, Chemistry for engineering students, Thomson Brooks/Cole, Belmont CA, 
De Graef M & McHenry ME 2007, Structure of materials: an introduction to crystallography, diffraction and symmetry, Cambridge University Press, Cambridge, 
Deming HG 1923, General chemistry: An elementary survey, John Wiley & Sons, New York
DiSalvo FJ 2000, 'Challenges and opportunities in solid-state chemistry', Pure and Applied Chemistry, vol. 72, no. 10, pp. 1799–1807, 
Emsley J, 1985 'Mendeleyev's dream table', New Scientist, 7 March, pp. 32–36
Fluck E 1988, 'New notations in the period table', Pure and Applied Chemistry, vol. 60, no. 3, pp. 431–436
Glinka N 1959, General chemistry, Foreign Languages Publishing House, Moscow
Hawkes SJ 2001, 'Semimetallicity', Journal of Chemical Education, vol. 78, no. 12, pp. 1686–87, 
Herchenroeder JW & Gschneidner KA 1988, 'Stable, metastable and nonexistent allotropes', Journal of Phase Equilibria, vol. 9, no. 1, pp. 2–12, 
Hinrichs GD 1869, 'On the classification and the atomic weights of the so-called chemical elements, with particular reference to Stas's determinations', Proceedings of the American Association for the Advancement of Science, vol. 18, pp. 112–124
Horvath 1973, 'Critical temperature of elements and the periodic system', Journal of Chemical Education, vol. 50, no. 5, pp. 335–336, 
Housecroft CE & Constable EC 2006, Chemistry, 3rd ed., Pearson Education, Harlow, England, 
King RB (ed.) 2005, Encyclopedia of inorganic chemistry, 2nd ed., John Wiley & Sons, Chichester, p. 6006, 
Kniep R 1996, 'Eduard Zintl: His life and scholarly work', in SM Kauzlarich (ed.), Chemistry, structure and bonding of Zintl phases and ions, VCH, New York, pp. xvii–xxx, 
Kotz JC, Treichel P & Weaver GC 2005, Chemistry & chemical reactivity, 6th ed., Brooks/Cole, Belmont, CA, 
Levy J 2011, The bedside book of chemistry, Pier 9, Millers Point, Sydney, 
MacKay KM & MacKay RA 1989, Introduction to modern inorganic chemistry, 4th ed., Blackie, Glasgow, 
Mendeléeff DI 1897, The principles of chemistry, vol. 1, 5th ed., trans. G Kamensky, AJ Greenaway (ed.), Longmans, Green & Co., London
Miles WD & Gould RF 1976, American chemists and chemical engineers, vol. 1, American Chemical Society, Washington
Nordell KJ & Miller GJ 1999, 'Linking intermetallics and Zintl compounds: An investigation of ternary trielides (Al, Ga, In) forming the NaZn13 structure type', Inorganic Chemistry, vol. 38, no. 3, pp. 579–590
Norman NC 1997, Periodicity and the s- and p-block elements, Oxford University, Oxford, 
Roher GS 2001, Structure and bonding in crystalline materials, Cambridge University Press, Cambridge, 
Smith A 1906, Introduction to general inorganic chemistry, The Century Company, New York
Swenson J 2005, 'Classification of noble gases', in Ask a scientist, Chemistry archive
Tarendash AS 2001, Let's review: Chemistry, the physical setting, Barron's Educational Series, Hauppauge, New York, 
Thompson R 1999, 'Re: What is the metalloid line and where is it located on the Periodic Table?', MadSci Network
Walker J 1891, 'On the periodic tabulation of the elements', The Chemical News, vol. LXIII, no. 1644, May 29, pp. 251–253
Whitley K 2009, Periodic table: Metals, non-metals, and semi-metals
Whitten KW, Davis RE & Peck LM 2003, A qualitative analysis supplement, 7th ed., Thomson Brooks/Cole, Belmont, CA,

External links 
 Summary of an ACS presentation on the "myth" of the dividing line

Periodic table